Choi Sung-Hyun  (born May 2, 1982) is a South Korean football player. He played for Jeju United, Gwangju Sangmu and Suwon Samsung Bluewings formerly. He related match-fixing scandal and his football career was rescinded.

References 

Fix

External links 
 

1982 births
Living people
South Korean footballers
Suwon Samsung Bluewings players
Gimcheon Sangmu FC players
Jeju United FC players
K League 1 players
Association football midfielders